Gochas is a village in the Hardap Region of Namibia. The area is at the center of a set of Kalahari Desert dune farms on which cattle and sheep graze.

History
The village has been the main settlement of the ǃKharakhoen (Fransman Nama), a subtribe of the Nama people, since 1889.

Gochas was a flashpoint in the colonial Herero Wars in German South West Africa. It was used as a military post and camel station under Imperial German rule. In January 1905 the Germans defeated the Nama chief Simon Kooper here. The final battle of the war, the Battle of Seatsub, was fought in Bechuanaland in March 1908. Capt. Friedrich von Erckert was killed in action, and a memorial was built in Gochas.

In 1960, the population was reported as including 205 whites, 108 mixed-race, and 224 blacks.

Politics
Gochas is governed by a village council, established in 1958, that  has five seats.

The 2015 local authority election was won by the SWAPO party which gained three seats (326 votes). One seat each was won by the Congress of Democrats (CoD, 96 votes) and the Democratic Turnhalle Alliance (DTA, 36 votes). The 2020 local authority election was won by the newly formed Landless People's Movement (LPM) which scored well all over Hardap. LPM gained 347 votes and three seats in the village council. SWAPO gained only one seat (147 votes), and the likewise new Independent Patriots for Change (IPC) won the remaining seat with 108 votes.

Climate

References

Populated places in the Hardap Region
Villages in Namibia
Herero Wars